Joanne Adamson OBE (born 1967) is a British diplomat. She is Deputy Special Representative in the United Nations Multidimensional Integrated Stabilization Mission in Mali (MINUSMA).

Career 
She graduated from  University of Cambridge, and Harvard University. From 2011 to 2013, she was Permanent Representative to the Conference on Disarmament. From 2014 to 2016, she was Ambassador for the United Kingdom to Mali and Niger.

References 

1967 births
Living people
British women ambassadors
Alumni of the University of Cambridge
Harvard University alumni
United Nations officials
Ambassadors of the United Kingdom to Mali
Ambassadors of the United Kingdom to Niger